In the past, the Podesta was a high official in Italian republics of the medieval or early modern period. (Currently, Podestà is still the title of some Italian magistrates, and of mayors in Italian-speaking municipalities of Graubünden in Switzerland.)

By extension, the word has been used in English to designate a particularly powerful government official or potentate.

The Italian title gave rise to a surname, which then gave rise to a company name.

Spelling variants
The surname has Italian, Spanish and English spellings which vary only by the position of an accent over the final "a".

Italian spelling: Podestà
In its Italian spelling (grave accent over the "a") the name "Podestà" may refer to:

 Agostino Podestà (1905–1969), Italian fascist politician
 Giovanni Andrea Podestà (1608–1674), Italian painter
 Guido Podestà (born 1947), Italian politician
 Massimo Podestà, Italian artist
 Rossana Podestà (1934–2013), Italian actress
 Stefano Podestà (born 1939), Italian academic and politician

Spanish spelling: Podestá
In its Spanish spelling (with an acute accent over the "a") the name "Podestá" may refer to:

 Babsie Podestá (1912–2004), Maltese water polo player
 Cristian Podestá (born 1991), Argentine footballer
 Horacio Podestá (1911–1999), Argentine rower 
 Inti Podestá (born 1978), Uruguayan footballer
 Jerónimo Podestá (1920–2000), Argentine bishop
 María Esther Podestá (1896–1983), Argentine actress
 Pablo Podestá (1875–1923), Uruguayan-Argentine stage actor, singer, acrobat
 Raúl Podestá (1899–1970), Argentine painter and sculptor

English spelling: Podesta
In its English spelling (with no accent), the name "Podesta" may refer to:

Andrea Giacomo Podesta (1620–after 1640), Italian engraver and painter
Heather Podesta (born 1970), American lobbyist
John Podesta (born 1949), American lawyer, White House Chief of Staff of Bill Clinton
Tony Podesta (born 1943), American lobbyist

English spelling: DePodesta
Paul DePodesta (born 1972), American football executive and former baseball executive

See also
Podesta (disambiguation)
Palazzo del Podesta (disambiguation)

References